Nathan Joseph Darling (born August 30, 1998) is a Canadian professional basketball player for the Ontario Clippers of the NBA G League. He played college basketball for the UAB Blazers and the Delaware Fightin' Blue Hens. He is the first and only player in NBA history to have played for Delaware in college.

High school career
Darling attended DeMatha Catholic High School and was teammates with top recruit Markelle Fultz and football star Chase Young.

College career
Darling began his collegiate career at UAB and averaged 2.5 points per game. As a sophomore, he averaged 10.1 points per game while shooting 40.9 percent on three-pointers. Following the season, he decided to transfer to the University of Delaware. On December 14, 2019, Darling scored a game-high 29 points against 20th-ranked Villanova in a 78–70 loss, after which his head coach Martin Ingelsby said he was playing like one of the best guards in college basketball. As a junior, Darling averaged 21 points per game. He earned first-team All-Colonial Athletic Association (CAA) honors. After the season, he declared for the 2020 NBA draft while retaining college eligibility. However, on August 3 he announced he was remaining in the draft and turning professional.

Professional career

Charlotte Hornets (2020–2021)
After going undrafted in the 2020 NBA draft, Darling signed a two-way contract with the Charlotte Hornets. Under the terms of the deal, he will split time between the Hornets and their NBA G League affiliate, the Greensboro Swarm.  This united him with Canadian assistant coach Jay Triano.

He made his NBA debut on March 13, 2021 against the Toronto Raptors, hitting a three-pointer in the fourth quarter, and became the first Nova Scotia born player in NBA history.

Ontario Clippers (2021–present)
On October 16, 2021, Darling was signed by the Los Angeles Clippers, but was waived shortly thereafter. On October 23, he was selected by the Ontario Clippers fifth overall in the 2021 NBA G League draft.

On February 17, 2023, Darling signed a two-way contract with the Los Angeles Clippers. He was waived four days later without having played a game for the NBA team. On February 23, 2023, Darling was reacquired by the Ontario Clippers.

Career statistics

NBA

|-
| style="text-align:left;"| 
| style="text-align:left;"| Charlotte
| 7 || 0 || 3.7 || .286 || .286 || 1.000 || .1 || .1 || .0 || .1 || 1.3
|- class="sortbottom"
| style="text-align:center;" colspan="2"| Career
| 7 || 0 || 3.7 || .286 || .286 || 1.000 || .1 || .1 || .0 || .1 || 1.3

College

|-
| style="text-align:left;"| 2016–17
| style="text-align:left;"| UAB
| 30 || 1 || 9.4 || .491 || .462 || .500 || .5 || .5 || .1 || .0 || 2.5
|-
| style="text-align:left;"| 2017–18
| style="text-align:left;"| UAB
| 33 || 31 || 28.0 || .477 || .409 || .830 || 3.0 || 2.8 || .4 || .3 || 10.1
|-
| style="text-align:left;"| 2018–19
| style="text-align:left;"| Delaware
| style="text-align:center;" colspan="11"|  Redshirt
|-
| style="text-align:left;"| 2019–20
| style="text-align:left;"| Delaware
| 32 || 32 || 38.3 || .446 || .399 || .854 || 3.9 || 2.8 || .8 || .2 || 21.0
|- class="sortbottom"
| style="text-align:center;" colspan="2"| Career
| 95 || 64 || 25.6 || .459 || .408 || .841 || 2.5 || 2.1 || .4 || .2 || 11.4

References

External links
Delaware Blue Hens bio
UAB Blazers bio

1998 births
Living people
Agua Caliente Clippers players
Basketball people from Nova Scotia
Canadian expatriate basketball people in the United States
Canadian men's basketball players
Charlotte Hornets players
Delaware Fightin' Blue Hens men's basketball players
DeMatha Catholic High School alumni
Greensboro Swarm players
Shooting guards
Sportspeople from Halifax, Nova Scotia
UAB Blazers men's basketball players
Undrafted National Basketball Association players